The Puerto Rico Coalition for Equity and Educational Quality  (CECE)  is a non-profit lobby group that advocates for changes in public policy aimed towards improving the quality of public education in Puerto Rico. The group is focused on raising awareness of the challenges faced by school directors and advocates before the Legislative Assembly of Puerto Rico, especially towards members of the Senate of Puerto Rico Commission on Education and Family Affairs and the House of Representatives of Puerto Rico Commission on Education and Nonprofit Organizations and Cooperatives. The group is led by Sapientis.

References

Non-profit organizations based in Puerto Rico
Political advocacy groups in Puerto Rico